Eliška Balzerová (born 25 May 1949) is a Czech actress. She has appeared in more than thirty films since 1971.

Selected filmography

Awards

 Czech Lion for Best Supporting Actress (2010)

References

External links
 

1949 births
Living people
People from Vsetín
Czech film actresses
Czech voice actresses
Czech stage actresses
Czech television actresses
20th-century Czech actresses
21st-century Czech actresses
Janáček Academy of Music and Performing Arts alumni